Mun Bhuridatta (1870–1949) was a Thai bhikkhu from Isan region who is credited, along with his mentor, Ajahn Sao Kantasīlo, with establishing the Thai Forest Tradition or "Kammaṭṭhāna tradition" that subsequently spread throughout Thailand and to several countries abroad.

Biography
Ajaan Mun was born in Baan Kham Bong, a farming village in Ubon Ratchathani Province, Isan.

Ordained as a monk in 1893, he spent the remainder of his life wandering through Thailand, Burma, and Laos, dwelling for the most part in the forest, engaged in the practice of meditation. He attracted an enormous following of students and, together with his teacher, Sao Kantasīlo (1861–1941) established the Thai Forest Tradition (the kammaṭṭhāna tradition) that subsequently spread throughout Thailand and to several countries abroad. He died at Wat Suddhavasa, Sakon Nakhon Province.

Forest meditation
Ajaan Mun's mode of practice was solitary and strict. He followed the vinaya (monastic discipline) faithfully, and also observed many of what are known as the 13 classic dhutanga (ascetic) practices, such as living off alms food, wearing robes made of cast-off rags, dwelling in the forest and eating only one meal a day. Monks following this tradition are known as thudong, the Thai pronunciation of this Pali word.

Searching out secluded places in the wilds of Thailand and Laos, he avoided the responsibilities of settled monastic life and spent long hours of the day and night in meditation. In spite of his reclusive nature, he attracted a large following of students willing to put up with the hardships of forest life in order to study with him.

Further reading
 The Customs of the Noble Ones, by Thanissaro Bhikkhu describes the Thai forest tradition started by Ajaan Mun.
 A Heart Released - The Teachings of Phra Ajaan Mun Bhūridatta Thera, is a record of passages from Ajaan Mun sermons, made during the years 1944-45 by two monks who were staying under his guidance. (Translated from the Thai by Ṭhānissaro Bhikkhu)
 
 Venerable Ācariya Mun Bhuridatta Thera: A Spiritual Biography, (online as html) "The biography of Ven. Ācariya Mun Bhuridatta composed by his disciple and fellow Ven. Ācariya Maha Boowa Ñānasampanno. Next to countless anecdotes one may find a great reflection of a live of a true Buddhist forest monk."
 Patipada – Venerable Ācariya Mun's Path of Practice, "A translation of the Dhutanga Kammaṭṭhāna practices of Venerable Ajaan Mun Bhūridatta Thera, also written by Ven. Ācariya Mahā Boowa Ñāṇasampanno."

External links

Thai Theravada Buddhist monks
Thai Forest Tradition monks
1870 births
1949 deaths
People from Ubon Ratchathani province